David Pearce is a paralympic athlete from Great Britain competing mainly in category C1 events. Pearce competed in three events in the 1984 Summer Paralympics in athletics. He won the bronze medal in men's Distance Throw.

References

Paralympic athletes of Great Britain
Athletes (track and field) at the 1984 Summer Paralympics
Paralympic bronze medalists for Great Britain
Living people
Year of birth missing (living people)
Medalists at the 1984 Summer Paralympics
Paralympic medalists in athletics (track and field)